Derek Nicholson (born November 30, 1986) is the inside linebackers coach at Cincinnati and a former American football linebacker. He played college football at Florida State Seminoles Football and previously coached at Southern Miss and Louisville.

College career 
A two-year starter at middle linebacker for the Seminoles, Nicholson led Florida State in tackles during his junior and senior season. In 2008 Nicholson was named to the Butkus Award and Chuck Bednarik Award Watch Lists. Nicholson finished his college career with 207 tackles, 25.5 tackles for loss, 3.0 sacks, and two defensive touchdowns.

Professional career 
After not being selected in the 2009 NFL Draft, Nicholson was signed by the Atlanta Falcons and participated in their mini-camp.

Coaching career 
Nicholson began his coaching career in the high school football ranks in North Carolina and Florida before moving onto the college coaching ranks. Nicholson spent 4 seasons at Southern Miss before returning to coach at Louisville, where he had coached in 2014. 

Nicholson would follow Scott Satterfield to Cincinnati after the 2022 season. However, in February 2023 Nicholson would be named the linebacker coach at Miami (FL) after Charlie Strong vacated the position.

Personal life 
Nicholson attended Mount Tabor High School in Winston-Salem, NC. Nicholson's older brother A. J. Nicholson played for the Cincinnati Bengals and his father Darrell Nicholson played for the New York Giants.

References

External links 
Florida State Seminoles bio

1988 births
Living people
American football linebackers
Florida State Seminoles football players
Dallas Vigilantes players